René Schiekel (born 25 August 1966) is a German former wrestler. He competed in the men's Greco-Roman 130 kg at the 1996 Summer Olympics.

References

External links
 

1966 births
Living people
German male sport wrestlers
Olympic wrestlers of Germany
Wrestlers at the 1996 Summer Olympics
People from Lübz
Sportspeople from Mecklenburg-Western Pomerania